The Hop-o'-Nose Knitting Mill was a structure representative of the industrial history of Catskill, New York in the nineteenth century.  The mill was built by Wolfe Bros., carpenters, and Mull & Fromer, Masons and Builders, in 1881 at 130 West Main Street.  West Main Street is located on the western side of Catskill Creek, while East Main Street is on the eastern side of the creek.  The mill was named to the National Register of Historic Places in 1995 as Hop-O-Nose Knitting Mill.  It has since been demolished, with the exception of the tower, which remains overlooking a lot full of brick demolition debris.

References

External links
 View the circa 1917 Chalmers Mills on the Mohawk River at Amsterdam, NY to see a later knitting mill which is facing potential demolition.

Industrial buildings completed in 1881
Industrial buildings and structures on the National Register of Historic Places in New York (state)
Buildings and structures in Greene County, New York
National Register of Historic Places in Greene County, New York
1881 establishments in New York (state)
Catskill, New York